Storkau is a village and a former municipality in the district of Stendal, in Saxony-Anhalt, Germany. Since 1 January 2010, it is part of the town Tangermünde.

Former municipalities in Saxony-Anhalt
Tangermünde